Roseburia faecis is a bacterium first isolated from human faeces. It is anaerobic, gram-negative or Gram-variable, slightly curved rod-shaped and motile. The cells range in size from 0.5-1.5 to 5.0 micrometres.  M72/1(T)=DSM 16840(T)=NCIMB 14031(T)) is the type strain.

References

Further reading
Staley, James T., et al. "Bergey's manual of systematic bacteriology, vol. 3."Williams and Wilkins, Baltimore, MD (1989): 2250–2251.

External links
LPSN
Type strain of Roseburia faecis at BacDive -  the Bacterial Diversity Metadatabase

Lachnospiraceae
Bacteria described in 2006